The 1955 West Virginia Mountaineers football team was an American football team that represented West Virginia University as a member of the Southern Conference (SoCon) during the 1955 college football season. Led by sixth-year head coach Art Lewis, the Mountaineers compiled an overall record of 8–2 with a mark of 4–0 in conference play, winning the SoCon title for the third consecutive season. West Virginia was ranked No. 19 in the final AP Poll and No. 17 in the final Coaches Poll.

Schedule

References

West Virginia
West Virginia Mountaineers football seasons
Southern Conference football champion seasons
West Virginia Mountaineers football